Sasha Regan (née Leask) is an English theatre director. In 1998, she founded the Union Theatre, London, a small fringe venue on the premises of a disused paper warehouse on Union Street in the London borough of Southwark. As of November 2020, she was still in charge of the theatre. Her theatre credits include Sweeney Todd, The Pajama Game, Annie Get Your Gun and H.M.S. Pinafore.

In 2007, Regan was awarded the Stage One Bursary for New Producers by the Society of London Theatre. This was followed by more success when the Union won in the category of Up-and-Coming Theatre at the 2008 Empty Space Peter Brook Awards.

Regan is a mother of two.

References

English theatre directors
Living people
Year of birth missing (living people)